Located in Nassau, The Bahamas, the Eugene Dupuch Law School is named after the lawyer and politician, the late Hon. Eugene Dupuch CBE, Q.C. It was established in 1998 as the third law school in the English-speaking Caribbean community.

The school, along with the Norman Manley Law School in Jamaica and the Hugh Wooding Law School in Trinidad and Tobago, offers a two-year practical professional training programme designed for persons who have obtained a University of the West Indies LLB degree or persons who hold a degree from a university or institution that is recognized by the Caribbean Council of Legal Education. Upon successful completion of the programme, candidates are awarded a Legal Education Certificate entitling them to practise law in The Bahamas.

See also 

 University of the West Indies
 Legal education
 Law degree
 List of law schools
 Caribbean Law Institute

References

External links
 

Law in the Caribbean
Law schools in the Bahamas
University of the West Indies